Jhalrapatan is a city and municipality, near city of Jhalawar in Jhalawar district in the state of Rajasthan in India. Its population is approximately 37,506. The former Chief Minister of Rajasthan, Vasundhara Raje, has been three times elected as MLA from this City. The name may be derived from "city of [temple] bells", or from the Jhala tribe of regent Jalim Singh. The first municipality was established in Jhalrapatan. India's last fort was built here.

History 
The ruins of the city cover an area of more than a mile from east to west and about a mile from north to south. Several specimens of punch marked and other old coins have been discovered, confirming the antiquity of the place.

Jhalrapatan is specially famous for its early medieval to later medieval temples. While the area was once famous for its many ancient temples, after the large-scale destruction during the Islamic invasions, now only four or five temples from the early medieval period still survive. The most famous of them is the temple of Sitalesvara Mahadeva. This temple is situated on the banks of river Chandrabhaga. Fergusson, the noted historian, considered this temple the oldest and most beautiful that he had ever seen and rated this to be one of the most elegant specimens of architecture in India. Other important, beautiful temples include Sun-Temple (Surya Mandir), Dwarikadheesh Temple, the temple of Kalikadevi, the temple of Varaha Avatar, and the Jain temple of Shantinatha.

A municipality was established at Jhalrapatan in 1892.

Temples

Sun Temple
The 10th-century Sun Temple (Padma Nabh Temple) is famous for its marvelous architecture and sculptures. The idol of Lord Vishnu inside the temple is famous.

Shantinath Jain Temple
Shantinath Jain Temple was built in the 11th century. The temple is beautiful with fine carvings and magnificent sculptures. It is decorated with two white elephants at the entrance of the main temple.

Education

Schools in Jhalrapatan include

•Government Engineering College, Jhalawar
•Government Higher Secondary School
•Government Girls Higher Secondary School
•Vasudha Sr. Secondary School
•Dr Radhakrishanan Sr Sec School
•Gyan Ganga Public School

Geography
It has an average elevation of 317 metres (1040 feet).

Demographics
As of the 2001 India census, Jhalrapatan had a population of 30,103. Males constitute 52% of the population and females 48%. Jhalrapatan has an average literacy rate of 69%, higher than the national average of 59.5%: male literacy is 77%, and female literacy is 60%. 16% of the population is under 6 years of age.

Religion
The largest religious groups are Hindus and Muslims, followed by, Sikhs and Jains.

Ethnicity
Festivals of all ethnic groups are enjoyed. Deepawali, EID, Milad-Un-Nabi, Holi, Muharram, and Rakshabandhan are the most celebrated festivals of Jhalrapatan. The annual town fair attracts tourists and is held in winter.

References

External links

Cities and towns in Jhalawar district